Ronald Wallace (1911–2006) was a theologian and Professor of Biblical Theology at Columbia Theological Seminary. He was also a member of the Torrance family of theologians.

Career overview
 Brora, Minister without Charge
 1940 Minister, Pollock Church, Glasgow
 Church of Scotland's Huts and Canteens
 1951 Minister, St Kentigern's Church, Lanark
 1958 Minister, Lothian Road Church, Edinburgh
 1964 Professor of Biblical Theology at Columbia Theological Seminary, Decatur, Georgia
 1977 Near East School of Theology, Beirut

Education
His secondary education took place at the Royal High School. At sixteen he matriculated at the University of Edinburgh and studied a degree in civil engineering. He proceeded to the Faculty of Arts.  Studies in Divinity followed; he was a pupil of H.R. Mackintosh and William Manson.  While Minister of St Kentigern's in Lanark he gained his PhD on Calvin's Doctrine of the Word and Sacraments.

Family and theological connections
In July 1937 he married Mary Moulin Torrance, the sister of Thomas F. Torrance.  They had a son, David, and two daughters: Elizabeth and Heather.  Wallace's nephews include theologians Iain Torrance and Alan Torrance; moreover, his son-in-law George Newlands is also an academic theologian.

Sources
Torrance, I.R. (1 March 2006) "Obituary: Professor Ronald Wallace" The Scotsman

1911 births
20th-century Ministers of the Church of Scotland
Scottish scholars and academics
Scottish Christian theologians
Alumni of the University of Edinburgh
2006 deaths
Columbia Theological Seminary faculty
People educated at the Royal High School, Edinburgh
People from Brora